Cristina Viorica Gheorghe (born 24 April 1986 in Slobozia) is a Romanian-born Italian handballer who plays for Romanian club HC Dunărea Brăila and the Italian national team.

She was the best goal-scorer of Italy in the 2014 European Women's Handball Championship qualification. The Italian national team did not manage to qualify but Gheorghe played in all six matches and scored a total of 32 goals.

Achievements 
Coppa Italia:
Winner: 2011

References

1986 births
Living people
People from Slobozia
Italian female handball players
Romanian female handball players
Italian people of Romanian descent
Naturalised citizens of Italy
Romanian emigrants to Italy
Mediterranean Games competitors for Italy
Competitors at the 2018 Mediterranean Games